Orrin Larrabee Miller (January 11, 1856 – September 11, 1926) was an American politician who served as a member of the United States House of Representatives for Kansas's 2nd congressional district from 1895 to 1897.

Early life 
Miller was born in Newburgh, Maine. He attended local common schools and graduated from the Maine Central Institute at Pittsfield, Maine. He studied law and was admitted to the bar in 1880.

Career 
Miller began his career in Bangor, Maine, before moving to Kansas City, Kansas, in 1880. He was appointed and subsequently elected district judge for the twenty-ninth judicial district of Kansas in 1887, and served until 1891, when he resigned to resume the practice of law. He served as counsel for many years for several large railroad corporations and was elected as a Republican to the Fifty-fourth Congress (March 4, 1895 – March 3, 1897). Miller declined to be a candidate for renomination in 1896.

Personal life 
Miller continued the practice of law in Kansas City, Kansas, until his death there on September 11, 1926. He was buried at Woodlawn Cemetery.

References

1856 births
1926 deaths
Kansas state court judges
People from Penobscot County, Maine
Politicians from Bangor, Maine
Politicians from Kansas City, Kansas
Republican Party members of the United States House of Representatives from Kansas
Maine Central Institute alumni